Source credibility is "a term commonly used to imply a communicator's positive characteristics that affect the receiver's acceptance of a message." Academic studies of this topic began in the 20th century and were given a special emphasis during World War II, when the US government sought to use propaganda to influence public opinion in support of the war effort. Psychologist Carl Haviland and his colleagues worked at the War Department upon this during the 1940s and then continued experimental studies at Yale University. They built upon the work of researchers in the first half of the 20th century who had developed a Source-Message-Channel-Receiver model of communication and, with Muzafer Sherif, (Muzaffer Şerif Başoğlu) developed this as part of their theories of persuasion and social judgement.

About
Source credibility theory is an established theory that explains how communication's persuasiveness is affected by the perceived credibility of the source of the communication. The credibility of all communication, regardless of format, has been found to be heavily influenced by the perceived credibility of the source of that communication.

The idea of credibility was first derived from Aristotle who argued that the speaker's reliability must be built and established in speech and that what the speaker did or said before such a speech was not of importance. Aristotle divided the aspects of persuasion into three categories: ethos (credibility), pathos (emotion) and logos (logic). As credibility refers to people believing who they trust, emotion and logic indicate a person's emotional connection and means of reasoning to convince one of a particular argument and/or speech.  The area of source credibility is studied for practical applications in communication, marketing, law, and political science.

Dimensions
There are several dimensions of credibility that affect how an audience will perceive the speaker: competence, extraversion, composure, character, and sociability. These dimensions can be related to French & Raven's five bases of power (see below). These characteristics are fluid and affect each other as well as the speaker's transactional credibility. One dimension may strengthen the speaker's credibility if he/she struggles in another.

The audience can perceive these attributes through certain behaviors in which the speaker delivers results, is concise and direct with the audience members. If a speaker displays characteristics of honesty, integrity, sincerity, and can show that they are trustworthy and ethical, the audience will be more inclined to believe the message being communicated to them, even if they do not remember every aspect of the interaction. They will, however, recall how the presenter made them feel, how they took in the information and what they may share with others once the presentation has concluded.

For instance, if a speaker presents the audience with a short clip and includes a witty joke at the conclusion of the video to drive the point home, members of the audience may only remember the joke. Although the joke may only be a small element of the entire speech, someone will recall it and share it with others and perhaps speak kindly of the speaker and wish to interact with that person again, or promise to purchase product or feel inclined to tell anyone who will listen about what they learned. This is when terminal credibility comes into play, but is dependent on how well the speaker presented the information to the audience.

Speakers must also present themselves to be likable since people are more inclined to trust those they generally like or feel comfortable with in a room. Being friendly, easy going, warmhearted, nice and kind can carry the speaker into a very comfortable space with the audience. Once the audience is at ease, the speaker can generally present their information, and it will be perceived positively.

The late Dr. James C. McCroskey (University of Alabama at Birmingham) was known for his research in the dimensions of source credibility. His scales for the measurement of source credibility have been widely used in communication research. He noted in his 1975 article, "Image of Mass Media News Sources", that "the available scales for the measurement of source credibility should not be assumed to be universally applicable measures of source credibility." However, his research and his proposed scale from 1975 are still foundations for source credibility research.

In McCroskey's work, he further breaks down each dimension as follows:

Competence 

The measurement of competence is based on seven values. These values are qualification, expertise, reliability, believability, openness (i.e. intellectual vs. narrow), value, and currency (i.e., informed vs. uninformed).

Character 

The measurement of character has four values. These are kindness, sympathy, selflessness (i.e., unselfish vs. selfish), and virtue.

Sociability 

The measurement of sociability has three values. These are friendliness, cheer, and temperament (i.e., good natured vs. irritable). Character and sociability may be combined by some researchers. In that case, researchers will employ the seven values under one "Character-Sociability" measurement.

Composure 

Four seemingly synonymous values are assigned to the measurement of composure. These are excitability (composed vs. excitable), calmness (calm vs. anxious), tension (relaxed vs. tense), and poise (poised vs. nervous).

Extroversion 

Like composure, extroversion is composed of four seemingly synonymous values. These are aggressiveness, boldness, talkativeness (i.e. talkative vs. silent), and voice (i.e., verbal vs. quiet).

Dr. McCroskey's research concluded that of the five dimensions of credibility, competence, character and sociability were the most important in establishing and maintaining credibility.

Dynamics

Initial credibility is established before a speaker appears before an audience to deliver a particular message. If there are few people in the audience who know the speaker, the level of credibility is at a low, and just the opposite can apply if the speaker is known. The levels are incredibly high with well-known authors, personalities, celebrities, politicians, professors and the like. For instance, the credibility would be incredibly low if a recently published author walked on a stage as opposed to Stephen King gracing the place with his presence. One simply has more of a trust/believable factor than the other.

B.J. Fogg identified initial credibility as surface credibility in his 2003 book Persuasive Technology: Using Computers to Change What We Think and Do. He defined it as credibility that derives from "initial judgments based on surface traits such as a persons' looks, his or her dress, or hairstyle"

The same can be said for advertisements. Generally, people are familiar with Nike, Puma and New Balance. A fairly new shoe company would have to work harder to gain customers. If a person/company is virtually unknown, they must create a sense of trust, believability in themselves and their product. People need to see evidence that the person/company can be trusted.  The well-known person/company has to live up to the previous expectations and not disappoint those who have shown up to see them speak and possibly purchase product. The advertising and marketing industry calls this brand management.

Transactional credibility is based on what takes place after initial credibility is established and during the course of interaction. Several factors affect credibility at this stage. How the audience receives the speaker's message, if the speaker will make a new or reaffirm old impressions, and how the speaker conveys his/her confidence or lack thereof are just a few. These factors could affect credibility either way for the speaker and affect how well the speaker's message is received. Either consciously or subconsciously, the audience examines the speaker's competence, likeability, passion, character, and, depending on the environment of the interaction, professionalism. To maintain credibility, the speaker should be knowledgeable about the subject, sincere in his/her approach, enthusiastic and even relaxed. All of this will make the audience lean more towards trusting and having faith in the speaker rather than the opposite. In this sense, the audience comes with an expectation and hopes to leave with a better feeling about themselves as it relates to the person, product and/or company.

Terminal credibility refers to what the audience takes away with them once the interaction has concluded. If the audience felt the speaker had good dimensions of source credibility, the terminal credibility will be high. On the other hand, if the speaker was incompetent, lacked character, did not maintain composure, and came off as unsociable and introverted, the terminal credibility will be low. This final form of credibility hinges on how the audience perceives the speaker and if the speaker uses valid information to get specific points across to those listening. Terminal credibility in one interaction will affect initial credibility in the next.

For example, a teacher delivers a lecture and informs the students that the works of Gabriel Garcia Marquez are not considered magical realism and uses one article in which to defend this argument to make it fit the speech. If students are intrigued and decide to go and delve further into the works of Marquez and finds several articles to prove that the author not only uses magical realism, but is credited with being its founder, then the credibility of the instructor is tarnished, and the students may not trust what is said in the classroom for the remainder of the school year. To ensure that the terminal credibility is positive, enhancing the speech itself is beneficial. A connection should be made with the audience, common ground displayed and speaking with conviction. The key is to build a substantial rapport with the audience so that the terminal credibility is positive.

Five bases of power

Source credibility has an explicit effect on the bases of power used in persuasion.  Source credibility, the bases of power, and objective power, which is established based on variables such as position or title, are interrelated. The levels of each have a direct relationship in the manipulation and levels of one another.

The social psychologists John R. P. French and Bertram Raven introduced the five bases of power: Coercive, Reward, Legitimate, Referent, and Expert.  This was followed by Raven's subsequent identification in 1965 of a sixth separate and distinct base of power: informational power.

Reward power 

Reward power is based on the perception that the persuading agent has the ability to provide reward, either positive or a decrease in negative result, for the target of the influence. Character and sociability are dimensions of credibility that can help establish reward power.

Coercive power 

Coercive power is based on the perception that the persuading agent has the ability to provide negative results, such as punishment or other reprimand, for the target of the influence.

Legitimate power 

Legitimate power is based on the perception that the persuading agent has the right, such as through a specific role or position, to influence and obtain compliance from the target of the influence.

Referent power 

Referent power is based on the identification with or association with persuading agent by the target of the influence. Character, composure, extroversion and sociability are the dimensions of credibility that help establish referent power.

Expert power 

Expert power is based on the perception that the persuading agent has special knowledge that can be provided to the target of the influence. Competence is the single dimension of credibility that can be directly linked to establishing expert power.

Informational power 

Informational power is based on the information, or logical argument, that the persuading agent can provide information or obtain information for the target of the influence.

The relationship between measures of power and credibility correlate considerably with one another, indicating that the French and Raven bases of power are not statistically independent concepts. The level of objective power affects the relationship between credibility and perceived social power. Credibility has a direct effect on perceived power. Therefore, individuals with the highest credibility also have the most perceived social power on all of the power bases. When individuals have a low amount of objective power, credibility significantly affects social power ratings.  High credibility increases judgments of perceived reward, coercive, referent, and legitimate powers. Expert powers are also influenced positively, but do not correlate at the highest levels of credibility. Therefore, the highest amount of credibility does not elevate perceived expert powers to the highest levels. However, credibility does not have considerable influence on the perceived social power of individuals with high initial objective power, due to perceptions of powerfulness based on this power.

In interpersonal relationships
Interpersonal credibility is based on a listener's perceptions of a speaker's expertness, reliability, intentions, activeness, personal attractiveness and the majority opinion of the listener's associates. First impressions play a significant role in interpersonal credibility and may be enduring.  Both children and adults take confidence and accuracy into account when judging credibility. Adults also take into account calibration (i.e., the speaker's own estimation of their accuracy as demonstrated by confidence and accuracy) and change their assessments of credibility if the speaker is revealed to have inaccurate calibration (e.g. is over- or underconfident). Children believe confident speakers over ones lacking in confidence and do not appear to take calibration into account, possibly because children have not reached the same stage of cognitive development as adults.

In politics
Candidates in political campaigns use credibility extensively to influence the attitudes and opinions of voters.  They attempt to prime, or connect specific issues or personality traits, to persuade voters to focus on those issues favorable to the candidate to influence a more positive opinion of the candidate.

A candidate's credibility is important in determining the effectiveness of political advertising. Advertisements for candidates with high credibility have a greater impact on influencing audiences and potential voters. Low credibility reduces the impact and influence of negative or comparative advertising supporting the candidate. A candidate with high credibility will better withstand the influences of any negative advertising.

Another application of credibility in politics is endorsements by celebrities attempting to use their status to influence voters. Celebrity credibility is based on numerous attributes, the most influential of which are trustworthiness and competence. High-credibility and low-credibility celebrity endorsers are perceived very differently. However, the level of credibility of celebrity endorsers, while important in the conveyance of their messages, does not influence the credibility of or attitudes toward candidates. They, therefore, may not change the political public opinions or voting behaviors of their audience.

Media credibility
Media credibility refers to the perceived believability of media content "beyond any proof of its contentions." Although its roots are in Hovland's classic persuasion research on source credibility, media credibility research has shifted the focus from characteristics of individual, personal sources to characteristics of media behaviors such as objectivity, accuracy, fairness, and lack of bias. Empirical research has found that media credibility is an important part, along with message characteristics and audience characteristics, of effective communication.

According to Dan Gillmor when becoming mediactive (i.e., an active consumer of media) source credibility is a very important aspect. He suggests that users be skeptical; they should be on the lookout for fallacies, such as the two-side fallacy, and people who are paid to persuade. He also believes that people need to exercise judgment, the idea of assuming that everything is lying is just as much a problem as assuming that everything posted or published is the truth.  Opening your mind is another important concept when considering source credibility. Most people are likely to consider a source credible if the content reflects ideas that the user also holds. Finally, Gillmor advises that people keep asking questions and follow up on sources to help realize their credibility.

Credibility is a core value of American journalism.  Credibility also is essential to the business aspect of the media. Loss of credibility may translate to loss of audience. Journalists themselves view loss of credibility as the biggest issue facing the industry.  Because the media occupies a significant part of people's daily lives, it significantly impacts the social construction of reality, the shape of public consciousness and the direction of sociopolitical change.  Therefore, media's credibility is as important as the message itself.

Journalist credibility 

The actions of some journalists have raised questions about credibility. Joe McGinniss was criticized for misleading accused killer Jeffrey MacDonald about whether or not he believed MacDonald innocent. Janet Cooke fabricated a Pulitzer Prize-winning story in The Washington Post. Jack Kelley fabricated stories that appeared in USA Today over a period of years. Jayson Blair plagiarized and fabricated New York Times stories. Dan Rather's career at CBS News ended after issues surrounding the credibility of a story. Numerous other examples of journalism scandals center on credibility issues. But, while credibility issues may end an individual journalist's career, those scandals do not seem to have much impact on public opinion; the public is mostly unaware of individual transgressions; when it is aware, it is not shocked; a majority of the public surveyed said news organizations sometimes made up stories.

Source credibility 

Television viewers distinguish between the credibility of official (or elite) and citizen (or nonelite) sources. Expert ratings alter subjects' judgments of source credibility.  Race does not affect credibility. Debate about the credibility of elite versus nonelite sources dates back to at least the 1920s. Walter Lippmann argued in favor of elite sources in his 1922 book Public Opinion. John Dewey argued citizens are credible sources in his 1927 book The Public and its Problems. Elite, male sources outnumber nonelite, female and minority sources in American journalism.  Television news viewers perceive stories with elite sources as significantly more credible than stories with nonelite sources. Source titles and manner of dress played a larger role in viewer estimations of credibility than did either race or even what the sources said on air.

Hard news and soft news 

Journalists and television viewers distinguish between hard news and soft news (or infotainment). Television viewers find hard news more credible than soft news.

Media type 

Whether a story appears in a magazine, newspaper or on television may also affect credibility. The credibility assigned to different media varies by race and gender of news consumers.

No-source stories 

Television viewers do not assign significantly more credibility to stories that include sources than they do to no-source stories.  This aligns with research suggesting that citing authorities in speeches that advocate a position makes little difference in shifting listener opinion.

Overall media credibility 

Viewers do not hold broadcast news as particularly credible and the credibility of broadcast news in the public's eyes is in decline. There is increasing evidence of public skepticism of media content. The General Social Survey charts a slide in media credibility ratings since the late 1980s. Contributory factors may include a perception that powerful people and organizations influence the press, doubt about media fairness, doubt about journalists' willingness to admit error, cynicism about standards and performance, and questions about values, morals and partisanship.

New media 

New media, such as blogs, are changing journalism. One study found that random citizens who contributed to a blog increased their credibility over time, to the point that traditional media outlets quoted them as sources.

Education 

Less educated people trust media content more than more educated people.

Media Credibility Index (from the International Council for Press and Broadcasting)

The Media Credibility Index is a relatively new publication, produced annually by the Next Century Foundation (NCF), together with the International Council for Press and Broadcasting. It was launched at the NCF's 2011 International Media Awards. It is currently being developed to try and cover a wide range of publications, assessing them in terms of press freedom, accuracy, incitement, bias, sensitivity and transparency, awarding plus or minus points as is seen fit. Points awarded are only based on items reported to the International Council for Press and Broadcasting that have been posted on the NCF media blogs. The purpose of the Index is to foster good journalism, responsible editing, balanced broadcasting and more responsible treatment of media professionals. It mostly focuses on Anglo-American media, the Middle East and South Asia.

To view the 2011 and 2012 reports in full, please follow the link: Media Credibility Index

The Internet
The development of the internet and its delivery of online information have created a new information environment that can affect perceptions of the credibility of that information. Online information can be created by amateur sources (e.g., blogs and citizen journalism) posted on personal sites or on news websites (e.g., comments on news stories, CNN's iReport). Seeking to satiate the insatiable online audience with "instant" news can result in inaccuracies and premature conclusions. Online "polls" intended to allow the audience to express opinions are insufficient in that they are neither random nor representative samples. The freedom for anyone to publish anything and the convergence of information genres (i.e., infotainment) affect editorial review and credibility.

A study of the impact of the internet on value orientations in mainland China by Jonathan Zhu and Zhou He (University of Hong Kong) revealed that credibility of the internet was far more important than conventional media to Chinese citizens. This may be because conventional media has a historical record of being credible whereas internet sources, especially user-generated content, can be questionable.

Websites are often the first or only interaction consumers have with a company. Also, these interactions are usually short- in the magnitude of a few seconds to a few minutes. Source credibility can be established online in a number of ways to include logo design, website sophistication, and source citation. Lowry, Wilson and Haig (2013) showed that well designed logos that are synergistic with the company's product/service can trigger positive credibility judgments about the company's website and results in greater trust and willingness to interact with the company. These effects are magnified when the website design extends and complements the logo design. Additional source credibility theory research has shown that color schemes and other visual elements can predict perceptions of credibility.

On social media sites, source credibility can be ascribed based on the number of followers and the ratio between followers and follows a user has. Research by Westerman, Spence and Van Der Heide (2011) shows that there is a curvilinear effect for the number of followers, "such that having too many or too few connections results in lower judgments of expertise and trustworthiness." A narrow gap between followers and follows may also result in a higher perception of competence (i.e., if a user has many followers but does not follow many others, that person may be regarded as less of an expert). Further research showed that frequency of updates led to higher perception of credibility.

Klout.com is a social media analytic website and app that ranks users according to online social influence and assigns a "Klout Score". Research by Westerman et al. has shown that a higher "Klout Score" results in higher perceived competence and character but has no bearing on the caring (i.e., sociability) dimension of credibility.

Focus groups have also shown that users evaluation criteria of blog credibility slightly differed from that of traditional media credibility. Participants indicated that the source of the blog was the first component evaluated and factors such as the source's knowledge, passion, transparency, reliability, and influence impacted credibility judgements. Participants also indicated that the blog's message/content needed to be authentic, insightful, informative, consistent, accurate, timely, popular, fair, and focused.

Popular culture
Source credibility has an enormous role in popular culture. Celebrity endorsement is a popular communication strategy in advertising and relies heavily on source credibility, at least in the United States. Dr. Roobina Ohanian, an associate professor of marketing at Emory University, developed a scale for assessing celebrity credibility and assessed the impact of celebrity credibility on consumers' purchase intentions. Her scale measured three components: attractiveness, trustworthiness and expertise. Though not as precise as McCroskey's scale, Ohanian's scale has been widely used in the United States.

Professional athletes' credibility is also important to pop culture. An athlete's credibility differs a little, however, from typical celebrity endorsers. Research indicates that negative information about an endorsing athlete can lead to negative impact directed toward the endorsed brand or product. Issues outside the realm of sport have been considered the source of negative information about an athlete (e.g., a scandal or crime). For example, when Tiger Woods' sex scandal became known to the public, Gatorade immediately severed its ties. Likewise, when Michael Phelps was indicted for illegal drug use, Kellogg's dropped him from their advertising campaigns.

Athletic performance, however, has come into question of whether it affects source credibility and, remarkably, it does. A study by Koo, Ruihley, and Dittmore (2012) shows that athletic performance is seen subconsciously as a reflection of a celebrity athlete's trustworthiness. Additionally, maintained or increased athletic performance following negative news may help the celebrity athlete to maintain or quickly regain his/her credibility.

Celebrity source credibility goes beyond product/brand endorsement, though. Oprah Winfrey, for example, was touted as the "doyenne of daytime television," and, as such, had an incredible following. She was able to utilize her credibility in a number of ways. Her book club would bring nearly instant success to any featured author. Her talk show would bring out the best (and worst) in its guests. And, most recently, she has been able to use her credibility and past success as the foundation for a media empire.

Physical attractiveness is another component relative to pop culture that has been researched. Physical attractiveness has been linked to credibility as an aspect of likability which can be classified under sociability or trustworthiness. Further research shows age has an effect on credibility. Steinhaus and Lapitsky showed that women of varying ages ascribe more credibility to older fashion models than younger ones. Their research concluded that "similarity between older models and older consumers resulted in significant positive effects for source credibility and interpersonal attraction. Younger consumers evaluated older models higher than younger models on one dimension of credibility, but indicated no other significant differences in attitudes toward younger or older models."

References

Belief
Communication
Persuasion